This is a list of 159 species in the genus Hypogastrura.

Hypogastrura species

References

Hypogastrura
Hypogastrual